Cloudy with a Chance of Meatballs 2 is a 2013 American computer-animated science fiction comedy film produced by Columbia Pictures and Sony Pictures Animation, animated by Sony Pictures Imageworks, and distributed by Sony Pictures Releasing. The sequel to 2009's Cloudy with a Chance of Meatballs, the film was directed by Cody Cameron and Kris Pearn with Phil Lord and Christopher Miller returning as executive producers. Bill Hader, Anna Faris, James Caan, Andy Samberg, Neil Patrick Harris, and Benjamin Bratt reprise their roles from the first film, while Will Forte, who voiced Joseph Towne in the first film, voices Chester V in this film. New cast members include Kristen Schaal as Chester's orangutan assistant, Barb, and Terry Crews as Earl Devereaux, replacing Mr. T. The film's plot focuses on Flint Lockwood and his friends returning to Swallow Falls to save the world after the presumed-destroyed FLDSMDFR reactivates, this time creating sentient food creatures.

Cloudy with a Chance of Meatballs 2 was released in the United States on September 27, 2013, and grossed over $274 million worldwide against its budget of $78 million. The film received generally positive reviews from critics, though it was deemed inferior to its predecessor.

Plot

After scientist Flint Lockwood saved his island Chewandswallow from his invention, the "Flint Lockwood Diatonic Super Mutating Dynamic Food Replicator" (aka the FLDSMDFR), Chester V, the CEO of "Live Corp" and Flint's childhood idol, offers his company's services to help clean the food off the island. He hires Flint, but during his short tenure at Live Corp, Flint enters a competition for a promotion, only to publicly humiliate himself by accident via an invention of his called a "Party in a Box", which prematurely goes off when he does not win.

Later on, Chester informs Flint that the FLDSMDFR is still functioning and creating sentient food creatures known as foodimals, one of which attacked his employees stationed on Swallow Falls. Chester tells Flint that he needs to travel alone to the island, find the FLDSMDFR, and insert a USB flash drive-like device known as the "BS-USB" to shut it down. However, Flint takes his pet monkey Steve, his meteorologist girlfriend Sam Sparks, her cameraman Manny, police officer Earl Devereaux, and former mascot of Chewandswallow “Chicken” Brent McHale. Flint also grudgingly accepts the help of Tim, his widowed father, who takes them to the island using his fishing boat. When Chester learns that Flint is not alone, he and his much-abused orangutan assistant Barb gather some of their employees and follow.

While Tim stays on the boat and makes friends with some living pickles, Flint and his friends work their way through the jungle-like environment of food that now completely covers the island. They encounter many foodimals, including a living strawberry Sam names "Barry". A Cheespider, the foodimal that attacked Chester's employees, chases Flint and the gang, but Chester arrives, scaring it off and joining the mission. Sam becomes suspicious of Chester's motives, as his claims about the foodimals being dangerous do not align with what they have observed. Flint is too afraid of failure to listen, eventually leading Sam, Earl, Manny and Brent to strike out on their own. They re-encounter and befriend the Cheespider, discovering that it was only acting hostile toward people wearing Live Corp gear. When the group deduces that the foodimals have realized something sinister about the company, as the "live" part of its name is "evil" spelled backwards, they are then captured by Chester's employees when they attempt to go back and warn Flint.

Flint, Chester, and Barb track down the FLDSMDFR, but after meeting and befriending some living marshmallows it created, Flint defies Chester and refuses to use the BS-USB. However, Chester inadvertently inserts the device into the machine himself, revealing it to be a hacking device designed to reprogram it. With the FLDSMDFR now under his control, Chester disposes of Flint and starts capturing foodimals, intent on using them as the key ingredients for Live Corp's upcoming line of food bars, as he discovered that the FLDSMDFR's food tastes better than average food. The marshmallows rescue Flint and reunite him with Tim. The duo realize that, without the FLDSMDFR, the existing foodimals will die out. As Flint offers his condolences, he is surprised to discover that the foodimals, having watched archive footage of him creating the FLDSMDFR, revere him as their creator. Inspired, Flint vows to save the island.

Tim and the foodimals catapult Flint and Barry into the unfinished Live Corp base. Some captive foodimals are freed by Barry, and they help fight off the company's employees. Flint confronts Chester, who threatens to turn his friends into food bars as well. When Barb begins to show reluctance, Chester dismisses her and battles Flint alone. Flint uses his "Party in a Box" invention to beat him and frees his friends. Chester attempts to escape with the FLDSMDFR, and is pursued by the foodimals and Flint's group. Barb turns on Chester for his abuse and steals the machine back, while Chester is eaten by the Cheespider. Flint returns the FLDSMDFR to where it was found, frees it from Chester's control, and reconciles with his friends. The residents of Swallow Falls return to their proper homes, adapting to the altered ecosystem and happily continuing their lives. The FLDSMDFR continues creating foodimals, which live and co-exist peacefully alongside the islanders.

Voice cast

 Bill Hader as Flint Lockwood: an inventor and Sam's boyfriend. 
 Hader also voices the FLDSMDFR, as he did in the first film.
 Bridget Hoffman as the young Flint. She replaces Max Neuwirth for the role.
 Anna Faris as Sam Sparks: a weather intern from New York City and Flint's girlfriend.
 Will Forte as Chester V: Flint’s childhood idol who is a world-famous super-inventor and the CEO of Live Corp. Forte voiced Joe Towne in the first film.
 Andy Samberg as "Chicken" Brent McHale: Flint’s former rival and bully and the former mascot of Swallow Falls' sardine cannery.
 Neil Patrick Harris as Steve: Flint's pet vervet monkey who communicates using a thought translator Flint invented; however, he only has a limited vocabulary and mostly just says his name, says a few random things, and reminds Flint that he's hungry. He later becomes Barb's love interest.
 Benjamin Bratt as Manny: Sam's Guatemalan cameraman and a former doctor, pilot, and comedian.
 Terry Crews as Earl Devereaux: the town's athletic police officer. He was originally voiced by Mr. T in the first film.
 Kristen Schaal as Barb: An intelligent orangutan and Chester's much-abused assistant. She later develops a crush on Steve.
 James Caan as Tim Lockwood: Flint's widowed fisherman father.
 Cody Cameron as Barry the Strawberry and the Pickles.
 Khamani Griffin as Calvin "Cal" Devereaux: Earl's son. He was previously voiced by Bobb'e J. Thompson from the first film.
 Al Roker as Patrick Patrickson: the anchorman of the weather station.
 Melissa Sturm as Sentinel Louise and Live Corp Scientist.
 Kris Pearn as Sentinel Peter and Labcoat Jenny.
 Craig Kellman as Flintly McCallahan and Idea Pants Guy.

Additionally, archive recordings of Mr. T. as Earl Devereaux can be heard in the film's opening.

Production

Development

The sequel was announced in April 2010, when website io9 reported that the original film’s directors, Phil Lord and Chris Miller, would not return for the sequel. In December 2011, it was reported that Cody Cameron, one of the story artists on the first film, and Kris Pearn, the head of story on the first, would direct the sequel, with Lord and Miller serving as executive producers. John Francis Daley, Jonathan Goldstein, and Erica Rivinoja wrote the screenplay, which is based on an original story idea, not on Pickles to Pittsburgh, Ron and Judi Barrett's follow-up book. In February 2012, it was announced that the sequel would be titled Cloudy 2: Revenge of the Leftovers, but it was later retitled to Cloudy with a Chance of Meatballs 2.

Casting
Bill Hader, Anna Faris, James Caan, Andy Samberg, Neil Patrick Harris, and Benjamin Bratt reprised their roles. The role of Earl, the town cop, was taken over by Terry Crews, since Mr. T declined to reprise the role. Kristen Schaal joined the cast to voice Barb, a talking and lipstick-wearing orangutan with a human brain. Will Forte, who voiced Joseph Towne in the first film, voices Chester V, a world-famous super-inventor who commands Barb and is the head of the Live Corp Company. On January 17, 2013, concept art from the film was released.

Music
The music was composed by Mark Mothersbaugh. Cody Simpson provided a single "La Da Dee", which was played at the film's end credits. Simpson also performed in a music video that incorporated footage from the film. Paul McCartney's single, "New", from his 2013 album, was featured in the film.

Release

Cloudy with a Chance of Meatballs 2 was originally scheduled for release on December 20, 2013, then pushed to February 7, 2014, before moving up to September 27, 2013.

Several food-packing events across the country were organized, with Anna Faris and Will Forte attending the main one in Los Angeles. Sony teamed up with marketing partners in the United States to promote the film through Subway Kids Meals with a set of 6 customized bags.

Home media
Cloudy with a Chance of Meatballs 2 was released on DVD and Blu-ray on January 28, 2014. The home media was accompanied by a quartet of animated shorts based on the main feature: Super Manny, Earl Scouts, Steve's First Bath, and Attack of the 50-Foot Gummi Bear. Two of the shorts, Super Manny and Earl Scouts, were already released online before the media release, premiering in October 2013 on Univision and Fandango, respectively. David Feiss directed all four shorts, which feature a computer-generated wraparound animation and a hand-drawn animation, provided by Six Point Harness.

Reception

Box office
Cloudy with a Chance of Meatballs 2 grossed $119.8 million in North America, and $154.5 million in other countries, for a worldwide total of $274.3 million. Its budget was reported at $78 million, while Sony spent $48.2 million for the film's marketing in the United States, and $41.3 million in other countries.

In North America, the film earned $9.3 million on its opening day, and opened to number one in its first weekend, with $34 million. In its second weekend, the film dropped to number two, grossing an additional $21 million. In its third weekend, the film dropped to number three, grossing $13.8 million. In its fourth weekend, the film dropped to number five, grossing $9.7 million.

Critical response
On review aggregator Rotten Tomatoes, the film has a rating of 71%, based on 120 reviews, with an average rating of 6.4/10. The site's consensus reads: "While not as clever or inventive as its predecessor, Cloudy with a Chance of Meatballs 2 compensates with enough dazzling visuals to keep younger viewers entertained." Metacritic, gave the film a score of 59 out of 100, based on 31 critics, indicating "mixed or average reviews". Audiences surveyed by CinemaScore gave the film a grade "A−", the same as the first film.

Michael Rechtshaffen of The Hollywood Reporter gave the film a positive review, saying "While not as delightfully breezy as the original, an engaging voice cast and hordes of 'Foodimals' still manage to serve up a tasty sequel." Linda Barnard of the Toronto Star called it "fun, even if it is occasionally so chaotic it tramples the movie's flow like a herd of stampeding Buffaloafs." Michael Phillips of the Chicago Tribune thought it "better in every respect than the original Cloudy With a Chance of Meatballs. It's also more fun than all three Ice Ages; Monsters University; Planes; Epic; Despicable Me 2; and though I could go on, I won't." Jordan Hoffman of the New York Daily News gave the film four out of five stars, saying "Cloudy 2 is loud, weird and chaotic—just as kids like it. ... sometimes it's good to have a sugary treat." Dave McGinn of The Globe and Mail felt it "promises more fun and laughs than it delivers, and this meal tastes like too many that have gone before it." Bill Goodykoontz of The Arizona Republic reviewed it as "the rare sequel that takes the spirit of the original and runs with it, coming up with something uniquely good in its own right."

In a lukewarm review, Tim Robey of The Daily Telegraph said "For all its properly surreal mayhem, this flick isn't quite as nimble or emotionally rounded as its predecessor." Sean O'Connell of The Washington Post wrote "Kids will chuckle, for sure. But parents who were pleasantly surprised by the original film's intelligence will miss Lord and Miller's guiding hands, as what once felt so funny now leaves a stale taste." Kyle Smith of the New York Post gave the film one out of four stars, saying "Whelk, I hope the makers of Cloudy With a Chance of Meatballs earned a nice celery, but I'm afraid they made a hash of things. A hash seasoned with oy sauce." Rafer Guzman of Newsday thought it "relies on the usual noxious recipe for junky kid flicks: loud noise, pop music and poop jokes." Miriam Bale of The New York Times felt it was "sometimes so strange, colorful and wildly cute that it may end up becoming a Yellow Submarine for a new generation." Tom Russo of The Boston Globe gave the film two out of four stars, saying "It's another brightly rendered effort, but, as the title indicates, a lot of the real creativity seems to have been used up the first time around." Mike Clark of USA Today gave the film two and a half stars out of four, saying "There's not a surprise or moment of tension to be found here, but the film is all energy and color that makes the discomfort of 3-D glasses seem worth it."

Jocelyn Noveck of the Associated Press thought the film worked for its audience: "this is a kid movie, and KIDS LOVE PUNS. So they laugh at 'There's a leek in the boat.' And they laugh even more the second time." A. A. Dowd of The A.V. Club gave the film a C, saying "Like too many sequels, this second helping of Meatballs confuses bigger for better, piling on the action but misplacing much of the original's charm." David Hiltbrand of The Philadelphia Inquirer gave the film three out of four stars, saying "This scrumptious sequel follows the same recipe as the 2009 original." Peter Hartlaub of the San Francisco Chronicle called it "a humorous yet unfocused romp, so unwilling to settle on a single theme that hyperactivity medication should be handed out with the 3-D glasses." Matt Patches of Film.com  wrote, "The 2009 original separated itself from the Pixar and Dreamworks competition with a joke-first approach. The sequel quadruples the recipe, with gags on top of gags on top of gags in a way only animation could achieve. Like a foodie Jurassic Park conjured up by Tex Avery, Cloudy 2 is a sight to behold … as long as your brain hasn't turned to mush by the halfway point."

Amy Nicholson of The Village Voice compared the franchise to "The Muppets and Pee Wee's Playhouse, kids' shows that ripen as their audience matures." Keith Staskiewicz of Entertainment Weekly  called it "charming enough." Steve Davis of The Austin Chronicle gave the film two out of five stars, saying "For both kids and adults, CWCM2 is little more than a vague memory as soon as it's over." Peter Debruge of Variety opined, "the pic's zany tone and manic pace are good for a quick-hit sugar high." Betsy Sharkey of the Los Angeles Times gave the film three and a half stars out of five, saying "Honestly, anyone who can pull off a running joke about leeks that does not make you gag, and is in fact a silly delight, deserves props." Bill Zwecker of the Chicago Sun-Times wrote, "Unlike so many sequels, this fun-filled 3D adventure is sure to entertain younger kids but also charm the adults".

Accolades

Video games
A video game titled Cloudy with a Chance of Meatballs 2, published by GameMill Entertainment, was released on September 24, 2013 for Nintendo DS and Nintendo 3DS. Its gameplay mechanic is similar to Fruit Ninja.

A free mobile game titled Cloudy with a Chance of Meatballs 2: Foodimal Frenzy was developed by PlayFirst and released for both iOS and Android devices. The game is no longer available on App Stores.

A downloadable app titled Foodimal Funimal was released for free by Sony Pictures Home Entertainment on iOS and Android mobile devices on August 20, 2013.

Future
A third Cloudy with a Chance of Meatballs film was announced but hasn't been confirmed or greenlighted by Sony Pictures Animation.

Notes

References

External links

 
 Production notes
 
 
 
 
 

2010s American animated films
2010s science fiction comedy films
2013 3D films
2013 comedy films
2013 computer-animated films
2013 films
3D animated films
American children's animated comic science fiction films
American computer-animated films
American sequel films
Cloudy with a Chance of Meatballs (franchise)
Columbia Pictures animated films
Columbia Pictures films
Films about food and drink
Films directed by Cody Cameron
Films directed by Kris Pearn
Films scored by Mark Mothersbaugh
Films set in San Francisco
Films set on fictional islands
Sony Pictures Animation films
Films with screenplays by Phil Lord
Films with screenplays by Christopher Miller (filmmaker)
Mad scientist films
2010s English-language films